Bănceşti may refer to several villages in Romania:

 Bănceşti, a village in Mușenița Commune, Suceava County
 Bănceşti, a village in Voinești, Vaslui